Exclusionism is the political ideology and practice of excluding people from the community, especially in the context of ethnic nationalism, racism, or xenophobia.

References

Xenophobia
Anti-immigration politics